Four ships of the United States Navy have been named Ajax, after Ajax, a Greek hero during the Trojan War.

 , launched in 1864 as USS Manayunk, renamed Ajax in 1869. Decommissioned 1898.
 , named Scindia, a collier, purchased in 1898 and later converted to a seaplane tender. Decommissioned in 1925.
 , a research vessel acquired in 1917, renamed USS Rockport in 1918. Sold   1919.

See also

Sources
 

United States Navy ship names